German submarine U-2 was a Type IIA U-boat of Nazi Germany's Kriegsmarine. Her keel was laid down 11 February 1935 by Deutsche Werke of Kiel as yard number 237; she was launched on 1 July and commissioned on 25 July 1935 with Oberleutnant zur See (Oblt.z.S.) Hermann Michahelles in command.

Design
U-2 had a displacement of  when at the surface and  while submerged. She had two shafts and two  propellers.

U-2 was fitted with three  torpedo tubes at the bow, five torpedoes or up to twelve Type A torpedo mines, and a  anti-aircraft gun. The boat had a complement of 25.

Service history
She had several commanders over her long career. Michahelles was relieved on 30 September 1936, by Kapitänleutnant (Kptlt.) Heinrich Liebe. Liebe turned command over on 31 January 1938 to Oblt.z.S. Herbert Schultze. On 16 March 1939, Kptlt. Helmut Rosenbaum assumed command and on 7 July 1940, Oblt.z.S. Hans Heidtmann joined Rosenbaum as deputy commander. On 6 August 1940, Georg von Wilamowitz-Moellendorf relieved Rosenbaum and Heidtmann and commanded until October 1941 when Karl Kölzer took over. On 16 May 1942, Oblt.z.S. Werner Schwaff relieved Kölzer, and on 20 November 1942, was relieved by Oblt.z.S. Helmut Herglotz. On 12 December 1943, Oblt.z.S. Wolfgang Schwarzkopf took over and commanded the boat until she was lost.

She was used as a school boat and trainer for her entire career except for two completely uneventful combat patrols in early 1940.

Fate
U-2 suffered no casualties to any of her numerous crews until 8 April 1944 when she collided with the German steam trawler Helmi Söhle west of Pillau (today's Baltiysk, Russia) and sank. 17 of her crew were killed; 18 survived. The wreck was raised the next day and stricken.

References

Notes

Bibliography

External links

German Type II submarines
U-boats commissioned in 1935
U-boats sunk in 1944
World War II submarines of Germany
1935 ships
World War II shipwrecks in the Baltic Sea
Ships built in Kiel
U-boat accidents
U-boats sunk in collisions
Maritime incidents in April 1944